Lukas Greiderer (born 8 July 1993) is an Austrian nordic combined skier.

He participated at the team event at the FIS Nordic World Ski Championships 2021., where he won gold and bronze medal in team events.

References

External links

Living people
1993 births
Austrian male Nordic combined skiers
FIS Nordic World Ski Championships medalists in Nordic combined
Nordic combined skiers at the 2022 Winter Olympics
Olympic Nordic combined skiers of Austria
Olympic bronze medalists for Austria
Medalists at the 2022 Winter Olympics
Olympic medalists in Nordic combined